Haukipudas is a town and former municipality of Finland. It is located in the province of Oulu and part of the Northern Ostrobothnia region. Its shore runs along the Gulf of Bothnia, with the river Kiiminkijoki running through the province. Along with Kiiminki, Oulunsalo and Yli-Ii municipalities it was merged with the city of Oulu on 1 January 2013.

The municipality was unilingually Finnish.

There were 16 villages in Haukipudas: Kirkonkylä, Santaholma, Ukonkaivos, Martinniemi, Asemakylä, Onkamo, Halosenniemi, Holstinmäki, Häyrysenniemi, Jokikylä, Kalimeenkylä, Kello, Kiviniemi, Parkumäki, Takkuranta and Virpiniemi.

The educational department took part in Lifelong Learning Programme 2007–2013 in Finland.

Local sights 
 The Haukipudas Church, built in 1762.
 Kiviniemi, a fishing village
 Virpiniemi
 Kurtinhaudan beach-forest
 Halosenniemi
 Haukiputaan homestead

Islands located off the Gulf of Bothnia 
The following is a compilation of some of the islands of Haukipudas located just off the coast of the Gulf of Bothnia:

Hanhikari, Hietakari, Hoikka-Hiue, Iso-Hiue, Iso-Miehikkä, Isonkivenletto, Kaasamatala (Hiuvet), Kattilankalla, Kellon Kraaseli, Kintasletto, Kotakari, Kriisinkivi, Kropsu, Laitakari, Lemmonletto, Länsiletto, Lönkytin, Mustakari, Mustakari (Martinniemi), Nimetön, Pallonen, Pensaskari, Pikku-Miehikkä, Pulkkisenmatala, Puukkoletto, Rapakari, Rivinletto (Kaasamatala), Santapankki, Satakarinletto, Ulko-Pallonen, Välikari, Ykskivi, Väliletto, Äijänkumpele.

Notable individuals 

 Topias Topson Taavitsainen , E-sports player
 Tytti Isohookana-Asunmaa, Minister and Member of Parliament (Centre Party)
 Osmo Jussila, political historian
 Merja Larivaara, actor
 Lea Laven, entertainer and singer
 Yrjö Murto, Minister and Member of Parliament (Finnish People's Democratic League)
Sakari Manninen, ice hockey player
 Sakari Pietilä, ice hockey player
 Lasse Pirjetä, ice hockey player
 Samuli Pohjamo, Member of the European Parliament
 Jukka Poika, singer
 Jukka Rasila, actor
 Riitta-Liisa Roponen, cross-country skier
 Eero Tapio, Olympic wrestler
 Mirja Vehkaperä, Member of Parliament (Centre Party)
Helena Benaouda, head of Muslim Council of Sweden

Haukipudas photo gallery

References

External links

Municipality of Haukipudas – Official website

Municipalities of North Ostrobothnia
Populated coastal places in Finland
Populated places established in 1866
Former municipalities of Finland
Haukipudas
1866 establishments in the Russian Empire